Polona Dornik (born 20 November 1962) is a Yugoslav and Slovenian former female professional basketball player.

External links
Profile at sports-reference.com

1962 births
Living people
Basketball players from Ljubljana
Slovenian women's basketball players
Yugoslav women's basketball players
Centers (basketball)
Olympic basketball players of Yugoslavia
Basketball players at the 1984 Summer Olympics
Basketball players at the 1988 Summer Olympics
Olympic silver medalists for Yugoslavia
Olympic medalists in basketball
Medalists at the 1988 Summer Olympics